Hans-Joachim Horrer (6 February 1908 – 12 September 1942) was a German U-boat commander in World War II.

Naval career
Hans-Joachim Horrer joined the Reichsmarine in 1933 and went through the usual officer training. He was a Gunnery Officer and Watch Officer on the destroyer Z9 Wolfgang Zenker from July 1938 to April 1940 when the destroyer was sunk during the fierce battles of Narvik, Norway. Horrer then started his U-boat officer training which lasted from July 1940 to January 1941. He was then assigned to the almost completed Type VIIC  as Baubelehrung commander on 18 January, then taking command of the boat upon commission on 30 January 1941. He served on the boat until 25 August 1941 but never went on patrol. He again served as Baubelehrung commander from 26 August to 24 September 1941. He then took command of the new Type VIIC boat . He went on eight patrols with the boat and was lost with his entire crew when the boat was sunk by depth charges from the British destroyer ., and depth charges from a Fairey Swordfish aircraft of the British escort carrier , south-west of Spitzbergen on 12 September 1942.

Summary of Career

Ships sunk

Awards
Narvik Shield
Iron Cross 2nd Class
Iron Cross 1st Class

References

Bibliography

1908 births
1942 deaths
U-boat commanders (Kriegsmarine)
Recipients of the Iron Cross (1939), 1st class
Reichsmarine personnel
Military personnel from Dortmund
Kriegsmarine personnel killed in World War II
People lost at sea
Deaths by airstrike during World War II